Theatrum Europaeum was a journal on the history of the German-speaking lands by Matthäus Merian, published between 1633 and 1738 in 21 quarto volumes.

Edition overview

References

External links
 Theatrum Europaeum - online copy at the university of Augsburg (German)

Publications established in the 1630s
Publications disestablished in 1738
1633 establishments in Europe
German chronicles